AG Hair is a Canadian hair care product company based in British Columbia, Canada. It is the largest independent manufacturer of professional hair-care products in Canada.

History
AG Hair was founded in 1989 by Lotte Davis, a South African-born graphic designer and her husband John Davis, a hairdresser from Liverpool, in their North Vancouver basement. AG Hair initially created bulk generic shampoos and conditioners that were bottled and labeled by hand. The Davis' began to formulate and manufacture their own professional hair care products, which they sold to salons directly beginning in 1990. In 2001, AG Hair products began selling to salons in the United States.

John and Lotte Davis (parents of actress Mackenzie Davis) are co-CEOs of AG Hair, which has 85 employees and sells in 14,000 salons in Canada, the United States, Australia, and Taiwan. AG Hair manufactures and distributes products from Canada.

In 2008, Lotte Davis founded Women Leading Change Foundation to help African girls obtain an education by building schools. AG Hair contributes 10 cents from every liter of product sold to support education for girls and women in Africa, through Every Bottle Counts.  Since its founding, proceeds from AG Hair product sales have raised over $2 million and built five schools in Sub-Saharan Africa. In 2015, AG Hair launched limited-edition packaging of its hairspray, Revamp, and its Firewall Argan Flat Iron Spray to raise funds for One Girl Can. 50 cents of each bottle sold goes to the foundation.

In October 2008, John and Lotte Davis received the Pacific Ernst & Young Entrepreneur of the Year Award for business-to-business products and services for AG Hair. That year AG Hair was named one of the best companies to work for in British Columbia by BC Business Magazine.

In 2012, Davis founded One Girl Can, a registered charity, with employees in Canada and Kenya. One Girl Can provides secondary, vocational, and university scholarships to eligible girls in Africa. AG Hair was featured in Business Vancouver's list of top 100 biggest manufacturers in Metro Vancouver in 2016. In 2017 and 2018, Deloitte named AG Hair Care one of the best managed companies in Canada.

References

1989 establishments in British Columbia
Companies based in Coquitlam
Personal care brands
Shampoo brands